Valerie Perez is a fictional character, a DC Comics supporting character and love interest for Bart Allen when Bart was the Flash.

Fictional character biography
The daughter of one of the enemies of the previous Flashes, Professor Manfred Mota, Valerie's life was saved from a riot at her high school by Bart Allen when he was Kid Flash. After being rescued, Valerie idolized the young hero and, being a scientific genius, devoted her life to studying the Speed Force and, in particular, Bart. After graduating from high school, Valerie worked for Tina McGee as a S.T.A.R. Labs intern at Keystone City and was in charge of working with Bart in sorting out what has changed in the Speed Force, after Bart refused to work with Tina. Managing to earn Bart's trust, the two kissed during a lab test.

Near that same time, Valerie's relationship to Mota was discovered by her employers, and despite Tina McGee's efforts, she was fired from her job at S.T.A.R. Labs. Mota called Valerie at her office, wanting to meet her, though she refused. Later, her father visited Valerie at her home, having somehow been transformed into an energy being, by reasons not yet explained. Leaving behind a fake Dear John letter for Bart Allen, that as expected prevented him from questioning Valerie's disappearance and search for her whereabouts, he took Valerie into an unknown location, hoping to use her DNA to restore his appearance, and use Valerie as a bait to take his vengeance on Bart, with Inertia's aid. Valerie survived the experimentation, and Inertia used her for a trap against Bart on Las Vegas after a phone call to him by disguising his voice with Valerie's.

Bart arrived to the penthouse of a Las Vegas hotel, only to find Inertia. Inertia then led Bart to Valerie, revealing that she was wired to a bomb. Faced with the classic choice of saving the girl he loves or Las Vegas, Bart deactivates the bomb and leads the bolt from the cannon around the world to destroy itself (arguably also the classic choice of a speedster). Inertia escaped and Bart, after aiding Las Vegas in recouping from the power loss of the cannon firing, returned to the penthouse to find Valerie. They rekindled their relationship there until morning.

Mota arrives at the penthouse, to try to convince Valerie of his love for her and desire to become human again, but is once again rebuffed by his daughter and thwarted by Bart Allen, being trapped in an electromagnet.

Valerie planned to rejoin S.T.A.R. Labs, with the help of Bart's newfound fame as The Flash. Despite this, Valerie loses her job anyway, being seen more as a liability than as an asset, implying in a conversation with Bart that her fall of grace greatly depended by her having a relationship with an active, accident-prone metahuman.

Her loss of employment, the strain of having a relationship with a metahuman of convoluted origins whose biological and chronological ages don't match and her growing feelings of isolation and inadequacy lead Valerie to carelessly vent her troubles and feelings, including the concern about Bart's secret identity, to her best friends: a thing Bart discovered during a double date, when Valerie's best friend, Brenda, rebuffed him with a barrage of sexual innuendos about his speed-related abilities.

While Valerie attempted to patch things up, opening up to Bart about her feelings and concerns, Bart snappily told her about Sue Dibny's final fate, comparing her brutal rape at the hands of Doctor Light and her grievous death with the destiny awaiting Valerie because of her carelessness. Deeply hurt by his lack of tact and understanding, Valerie unilaterally broke off their relationship.

Later, having a change of heart about Bart's concerns about her, she followed him to the Police Academy, hoping to restart their relationship. But Bart, having been forewarned by his grandmother Iris West, about a battle awaiting him in the near future, with only few chances to win, and stay alive, spurned her coldly, hoping to spare her the pain of his highly probable death.

Despite this, Iris Allen showed up to call Bart's bluff to her, asking for Valerie's help in foiling Inertia's plan to strip the Speed Force out of Bart, and leave him to die at the hands of the Rogues. Valerie complies, but fails: as Bart, now powerless, stopped Inertia from attacking Valerie and prevented her from tampering with the machines meant to steal Bart's powers, the Rogues, afraid of being incarcerated again and miscalculating the strength of their best shots upon a powerless Flash, killed him in front of Valerie's eyes.

As Valerie held his hands for the last time, with his dying breath Bart Allen finally professed his undying love for her.

Valerie has not been seen in any DC publications since Wally West's re-emergence as The Flash and apparently Bart hasn't made contact with her since his resurrection (although the last may be because Bart has reverted to his teenage body since he was reborn, making any reunion between them awkward at best).

References

External links
Hyperborea article on Valerie

Characters created by Tony S. Daniel
Characters created by Art Thibert
Perez, Valerie
DC Comics scientists
Comics characters introduced in 2006
Fictional female scientists
Flash (comics) characters